Panki Assembly constituency   is an assembly constituency in the Indian state of Jharkhand. Panki city is situated on Daltonganj to Balumath State highway, in the district Palamu Jharkhand.

Members of Assembly 
2005: Bidesh Singh, Rashtriya Janata Dal
2009: Bidesh Singh, Independent candidate
2014: Bidesh Singh, Indian National Congress*
2016: Devendra Kumar Singh, Indian National Congress By Poll
2019: Kushwaha Shashi Bhushan Mehta, Bharatiya Janata Party

Bidesh Singh died of cardiac arrest on 28 March 2016. Devendra Kumar Singh was chosen as his successor.

See also
Vidhan Sabha
Jharkhand Legislative Assembly
List of states of India by type of legislature
Panki, Jharkhand
List of constituencies of the Jharkhand Legislative Assembly

References

External links
ECI

Assembly constituencies of Jharkhand